This is the list of number-one tracks on the ARIA Club Chart in 2023, and is compiled by the Australian Recording Industry Association (ARIA) from weekly DJ reports.

2023

Number-one artists

See also
2023 in music

References

Number-one singles
Australia Club Chart
2023 Club